Kvam is a former municipality in what was Nord-Trøndelag county in Norway. The  municipality existed from 1909 until its dissolution in 1964. The municipality encompassed the areas north and west of the lake Snåsavatnet in what is now the municipality of Steinkjer in Trøndelag county. The administrative centre was the village of Kvam on the shore of the lake. Most of the population of Kvam municipality lived along the lake shore. Farther north from the lake includes a wilderness area including the large lakes Gilten and Bangsjøene. The main church for the municipality was Kvam Church, located in the village of Kvam.

History
The municipality of Kvam was established on 1 January 1909 when the large municipality of Stod was split into two:  Kvam (population: 934) in the north and Stod (population: 1,169) in the south. During the 1960s, there were many municipal mergers across Norway due to the work of the Schei Committee. On 1 January 1964, a large merger took place: the neighboring municipalities of Beitstad (population: 2,563), Egge (population: 3,476), Kvam (population: 1,245), Ogndal (population: 2,678), Sparbu (population: 4,027), and Stod (population: 1,268) were all merged with the town of Steinkjer (population: 4,325) to form the new municipality of Steinkjer.

Name
The municipality (originally the parish) is named after the old Kvam farm since the first Kvam Church was built there. The name comes from the word  which means "grassy hollow" or "little vale".

Government
While it existed, this municipality was responsible for primary education (through 10th grade), outpatient health services, senior citizen services, unemployment, social services, zoning, economic development, and municipal roads. During its existence, this municipality was governed by a municipal council of elected representatives, which in turn elected a mayor.

Municipal council
The municipal council  of Kvam was made up of 13 representatives that were elected to four year terms. The party breakdown of the final municipal council was as follows:

Mayors
The mayors of Kvam:

 1909–1910: Ole H. Langhammer (V)
 1911–1913: Nils Flekstad 
 1914–1925: Ole H. Langhammer (V/Bp)
 1925–1941: Peter H. Wanderaas (Bp)
 1942–1943: Birger Øksnes 
 1944–1945: Aksel Aassve 
 1945–1945: Sverre M. Sem (Bp)
 1946–1947: Arne Grøtan (Bp)
 1948–1959: Sverre M. Sem (Bp)
 1959–1959: Oleiv Flekstad (Sp)
 1960–1963: Olav Hus (Sp)

See also
List of former municipalities of Norway

References

Steinkjer
Former municipalities of Norway
1909 establishments in Norway
1964 disestablishments in Norway